The SiTech DEV1 is a battery electric city car engineered and produced by the Chinese manufacturer FAW under their electric vehicle brand SiTech (Xinte, 新特).

History

The public debut for the SiTech DEV1 was during the 2018 Beijing Auto Show and it was launched in the China car market in Q3, 2018.

Prices of the SiTech DEV1 electric city car in 2018 ranged from 139,900 yuan to 164,900 yuan.

Description

According to SiTech, the battery of the DEV1 is capable of a range of 350 kilometers, and charging takes 40 minutes for 80% of battery charge. The charging port is located at the center front of the car. DEV1 can be charged in about 5.5 hours through a 6.6 kW onboard charger or a Wallbox at home or through public chargers the size of the onboard charger. However, the DEV1 can be charged from empty to 80% in around 40 minutes by charging at a fast-charging station.

References

External links 

 Official Sitech DEV1 website
 About the DEV1 Vehicle 

City cars
Hatchbacks
2010s cars
Cars introduced in 2018
Electric car models
Production electric cars
Cars of China